Dinesh Gundu Rao (born 9 October 1969) is an Indian politician from INC who is the Incharge of All India Congress Committee of Goa, Tamil Nadu and Puducherry. He was the President of Karnataka Pradesh Congress Committee. and the member of Karnataka Legislative Assembly.


Personal life 
He was born in Kushal Nagar, Coorg. He is the second of the three sons of former Chief Minister of Karnataka, R. Gundu Rao.

Gundu Rao attended Bishop Cotton Boys' School in Bangalore. He completed a B.E in Electronics and Communications from B.M.S. College of Engineering in 1992.

He married Tabassum Rao and has two daughters, living in Bangalore, Karnataka.

Career 
Gundu Rao was the Congress candidate for Assembly Constituency (Bruhat Bengaluru Mahanagara Palike District) in the 1999 Karnataka Legislative Assembly Elections. The count of total votes polled for this election was 61212. Out of these, Dinesh Gundurao of Congress secured 40797 votes to win the seat, defeating the nearest rival Nagaraj V of JD (S) by a margin of 28268 votes.

He was president of the Karnataka Youth Congress, and is currently a Member of the Legislative Assembly for fifth time (MLA).
He is  five time winner in the Karnataka elections. Dinesh Gundu Rao was minister of state for food, civil supplies and consumer affairs in the government of Karnataka, and he was President of the KPCC.

References

1969 births
Living people
Indian National Congress politicians from Karnataka
People from Kodagu district
Karnataka MLAs 2008–2013
Karnataka MLAs 2018–2023